Mutineers is the tenth studio album by English singer-songwriter David Gray, released on 17 June 2014 on IHT Records. "Back in the World" was the first single from the album.

Background
On 1 April 2014, the video for "Gulls" premiered on both the Myles O'Reilly website and Gray's official YouTube channel, with O'Reilly being the director.

On 10 April 2014, the track "Back in the World" was uploaded onto Gray's official YouTube channel. A day later, the song was played by radio presenter Chris Evans on BBC Radio 2 for The Chris Evans Breakfast Show.

Track listing

Personnel
 David Gray – vocals, pianos, guitars, keyboards, harp, harmonica, Juno synthesizer
 Rob Malone – bass, acoustic, electric and nylon string guitars, e-bow, high strung guitar
 Keith Prior – drums, percussion
 Caroline Dale – cello
 Andy Barlow – programming

Charts

References

David Gray (musician) albums
Polydor Records albums
2014 albums